Beatrice of Bourbon (1320 – 23 December 1383) was a French noblewoman. A member of the House of Bourbon, she was by marriage Queen of Bohemia and Countess of Luxembourg.

She was the youngest daughter of Louis I, Duke of Bourbon, and Mary of Avesnes.

Life

Marriage

On 28 September 1330, Queen Elisabeth of Bohemia, wife of King John of Bohemia, died:

"The news was that the King, distraught for the loss of his wife manifested his feelings using mourning clothes, after all, they were married for twenty years, and yet remained completely himself with a brief time, this was in Bohemia, the other side used to be mostly in their county or elsewhere, where he discussed the matter."

Despite the fact that John and Elisabeth became estranged during the last years of their marriage, the king remained a widower for the next four years. The French King Philip VI wanted to tie John more closely with France, and he suggested to the Bohemian king a second marriage. The proposed bride was Beatrice, youngest daughter of the Duke of Bourbon and member of a cadet branch of the House of Capet. Beatrice was already betrothed, however, to Philip, the second son of Philip I, Prince of Taranto, as of 29 May 1321. The engagement was broken soon after the marriage negotiations with Bohemia started.

The marriage of King John of Bohemia and Beatrice of Bourbon was solemnized in the Château de Vincennes in December 1334, at which time she was fourteen years old. But because the two were related in a prohibited degree (they were second cousins through their common descent from Henry V, Count of Luxembourg, and his wife Margaret of Bar), Pope Benedict XII had to give dispensation for the marriage, which was granted in Avignon on 9 January 1335 at the request of Philip VI.

The marriage contract stipulated that if a son was born from the marriage, the County of Luxembourg (King John's paternal heritage), as well as lands belonging to it, would go to him. King John's sons from his first marriage, Charles and John Henry, were not informed of the contents of the marriage contract, but both princes were compelled to accept it along with the knights and citizens of Luxembourg in August 1335.

Life in Bohemia

Beatrice arrived in Bohemia on 2 January 1336:

"...our father came to Bohemia and brought him a wife, named Beatrix, daughter of the Duke of Bourbon and relative of the King of the Frenchs..."

In the Bohemian court, Beatrice took care of the wife of her oldest stepson Charles, Blanche of Valois. Both women could easily communicate in French. The Queen soon felt ill-at-ease in Prague, where she was always compared unfavorably with the Margravine of Moravia (Blanche's title as wife of the Bohemian heir). Also, the Czech people were offended by her coldness, insolence and aversion to learning their language.

The new Queen of Bohemia and Countess of Luxembourg brought with her an annual income of 4,000 livres extracted from her father's County of Clermont. On 25 February 1337, Beatrice gave birth in Prague to her only child, a son named Wenceslaus after the holy patron of the Přemyslid dynasty; probably calling her son with this name either the queen or her husband tried to gain the favor of the Bohemians. There is some indirect evidence that this was the first caesarean section that was survived by both the mother and child. However, the relationship between Beatrice and her new subjects remained estranged: her coronation as Queen of Bohemia in St. Vitus Cathedral three months later, on 18 May, was an event of spectacular indifference  from the citizens of Prague.

Shortly after her coronation, in June 1337, Beatrice left Bohemia leaving her son behind, and went to live in Luxembourg. After this, she rarely visited the Bohemian Kingdom.

Later Years

On 26 August 1346 King John was killed in the Battle of Crécy and Beatrice ceased to be queen consort. Her stepson, now King Charles of Bohemia, confirmed the provisions of her marriage contract. Beatrice, now Dowager Queen of Bohemia, received in perpetuity lands in the County of Hainaut, the rent of 4,000 livres and the towns of Arlon, Marville and Damvillers (where she settled her residence) as her widow's estate. These revenues were used not only for their own needs, but also for the education of her son. King Charles also left her all the movable property and income from the mines in Kutná Hora. In addition, when her father Duke Louis I of Bourbon died in 1342, she received the sum of 1,000 livres, which was secured from the town of Creil.

Around 1347, Beatrice married for a second time to Eudes II, Lord of Grancey, (then a widower) at her state of Damvillers. Despite her new marriage, she retained the title of Queen of Bohemia. The couple had no children. Soon after her second marriage, she arranged the betrothal of her son Wenceslaus with the widowed Joanna, Duchess of Brabant, daughter and heiress of John III, Duke of Brabant, who was fifteen years older than he was. The marriage took place in Damvillers four years later, on 17 May 1351.

Despite all the grants of land and money given to Beatrice, the Bohemian king delayed the investiture of his young half-brother Wenceslaus as Count of Luxembourg. In fact, he held on to the title until 1353, when Wenceslaus finally obtained sovereignty over the County.  One year later (13 March 1354) the County was elevated to the rank of a Duchy.

Beatrice died on 27 December 1383, having outlived her son (for only sixteen days) and all her stepchildren. She was buried in the now-demolished church of the Couvent des Jacobins in Paris - her effigy is now in the Basilica of St Denis. Her second husband survived her by six years.

References

Sources

Further reading

|-

1320 births
1383 deaths
House of Bourbon (France)
Bohemian queens consort
Remarried royal consorts
Countesses of Luxembourg
14th-century French people
14th-century French women
Royal reburials